{{DISPLAYTITLE:CH2O3}}
The molecular formula CH2O3 (molar mass: 62.02 g/mol, exact mass: 62.0004 u) may refer to:

 Carbonic acid
 Performic acid (PFA)